(–)-β-Pinene synthase (EC 4.2.3.120, β-geraniolene synthase, (–)-(1S,5S)-pinene synthase, geranyldiphosphate diphosphate lyase (pinene forming)) is an enzyme with systematic name geranyl-diphosphate diphosphate-lyase [cyclizing, (–)-β-pinene-forming]. This enzyme catalyses the following chemical reaction

 geranyl diphosphate  (–)-β-pinene + diphosphate

Cyclase II of Salvia officinalis (sage) produces about equal parts (–)-α-pinene, (–)-β-pinene and (–)-camphene.

References

External links 
 

EC 4.2.3